Rodney Carwell Bellinger (born June 4, 1962) is a former American football player. He spent 3 seasons in the National Football League (NFL) with the Buffalo Bills after being drafted by them in the 3rd round of the 1984 NFL Draft. He played in 42 games and started 11 at cornerback. He went to college at Miami. He has recorded 3 interceptions for 78 yards.

Buffalo Bills 
Bellinger signed with the Bills on July 12, 1984.

References

External links 
 Pro Football Reference page

1962 births
Living people
Players of American football from Miami
Miami Hurricanes football players
Buffalo Bills players